Linxair was a business airline based in Slovenia. It was established and started operations in 1999 at its base, Ljubljana Jože Pučnik Airport (LJU). Linxair was the fastest-growing aviation company in Slovenian history and the biggest business aviation operator in the area of former Yugoslavia. Due to financial difficulties which started in 2009, the company declared bankruptcy in 2014. Shortly before bankruptcy, the company headquarters were moved from Ljubljana to Slovenj Gradec. A small part of the fleet continued operation under another operator, SiAvia.

Fleet (1999 - 2013)

Piper PA-46-350P Malibu Mirage (from 1999 - 2004)
Piper PA-46T JetProp Malibu (2001 - 2006)
Cessna 525 CitationJet (2004 - 2007)
Cessna 525 CitationJet1 (2007 - 2013)
Cessna 525A CitationJet2+ (2007 - 2010)
Cessna 525A CitationJet2+ (2008 - 2013)
Cessna 525B CitationJet3 (2007 - 2012)
Cessna 560XL Citation Excel (2005 - 2013)
Cessna 560XL Citation Excel (2011 - 2012)
Cessna 560XL Citation XLS (2007 - 2013)
Embraer 135BJ Legacy 600 (2007 - 2012)
Embraer 135BJ Legacy 600 (2008 - 2012)
Embraer 145 ERJ (2011 - 2012)
Embraer 145 ERJ (2012)

References

Defunct airlines of Slovenia
Airlines established in 1999
Airlines disestablished in 2014
2014 disestablishments in Slovenia
Slovenian companies established in 1999